Munishree Nagraj is an Indian writer, poet in Hindi language. He won the Moortidevi Award in 1990.

References

Hindi-language poets